Breidden railway station was a station in Middletown, Powys, Wales. The station closed in 1960. There was a station house and two staggered platforms as well as a goods siding. The station has been demolished.

References

Further reading

Disused railway stations in Powys
Railway stations in Great Britain opened in 1862
Railway stations in Great Britain closed in 1960
Former Great Western Railway stations
Former London and North Western Railway stations